Matt Bush is the name of:
Matt Bush (actor) (born 1986), American actor
Matt Bush (baseball) (born 1986), American baseball pitcher

See also 
 Bush (surname)